Barry Gordine (born 1 September 1948) is an English retired professional footballer who played in the Football League for Oldham Athletic as a goalkeeper.

References 

Living people
English footballers
English Football League players
1948 births
Footballers from Bethnal Green
Association football goalkeepers
Ebbsfleet United F.C. players
Sheffield United F.C. players
Oldham Athletic A.F.C. players
Southend United F.C. players
Brentford F.C. players
Southern Football League players